Trifurcula corothamni is a moth of the family Nepticulidae. It was described by Zdenek Laštuvka and Ales Laštuvka in 1994. It is known from the Czech Republic and Slovakia.

References

Nepticulidae
Moths of Europe
Moths described in 1994